Marijan Šuto (born 2 October 1996) is a Croatian footballer who plays as a forward for Cypriot Second Division side Othellos Athienou.

Career

NK Orkan Dugi Rat
He started with NK Orkan Dugi Rat youth team when he is in Croatia before moving to RNK Split.

RNK Split
In RNK Split, he played for the U17 & U19 team.

Imotski FC
After leaving Split, he moved to Imotski FC playing for their U19 team in 2013.

Croatia Zmijavci
After leaving the U19 team in Imotski, he moved to play for Croatia Zmijavci who is in the 4th tier of Croatia football.

Warriors FC
In 2016, he signed for the Warriors FC prime league team, which is the reserve team in the S.League, from Singapore.  He was the top scorer in the 2016 prime league.  He scored 30 goals in 2016, 11 more goals ahead of his nearest rivals.

Home United
He then moved to the Home United Prime League squad before the start of 2017 season.  He made his debut in the AFC Cup competition against Myanmar Club.

References

External links
 

1996 births
Living people
Footballers from Split, Croatia
Association football midfielders
Association football wingers
Association football forwards
Croatian footballers
NK Croatia Zmijavci players
Warriors FC players
Home United FC players
Omonia Psevda players
Othellos Athienou F.C. players
First Football League (Croatia) players
Singapore Premier League players
Croatian expatriate footballers
Expatriate footballers in Singapore
Croatian expatriate sportspeople in Singapore
Expatriate footballers in Germany
Croatian expatriate sportspeople in Germany
Expatriate footballers in Cyprus
Croatian expatriate sportspeople in Cyprus